The 87th United States Congress was a meeting of the legislative branch of the United States federal government, composed of the United States Senate and the United States House of Representatives. It met in Washington, D.C. from January 3, 1961, to January 3, 1963, during the final weeks of Dwight D. Eisenhower's presidency and the first two years of John Kennedy's presidency. The apportionment of seats in the House of Representatives was based on the 1950 United States census, along with 2 seats temporarily added in 1959 (one member each from recently admitted states of Alaska and Hawaii).

Both chambers had a Democratic majority (albeit reduced in the House).  With President Kennedy being sworn in on January 20, 1961, this gave the Democrats an overall federal government trifecta for the first time since the 81st Congress in 1949.

Major events 

 January 3, 1961: President Eisenhower severed diplomatic and consular relations with Cuba.
 January 20, 1961: Inauguration of President John F. Kennedy.
 April 17, 1961: Bay of Pigs Invasion of Cuba began; it fails by April 19.
 May 4, 1961: Freedom Riders began interstate bus rides to test the new U.S. Supreme Court integration decision.
 May 5, 1961: Alan Shepard became the first American in space aboard Mercury-Redstone 3.
 May 25, 1961: President Kennedy announced his goal to put a man on the Moon before the end of the decade
 November 20: 1961: Funeral of Speaker Sam Rayburn, who died on November 16
 February 3, 1962: Embargo against Cuba was announced
 February 20, 1962: John Glenn became the first American to orbit the Earth
 March 26, 1962: Supreme Court ruled that federal courts could order state legislatures to reapportion seats (Baker v. Carr)
 October 1, 1962: James Meredith registered as the first black student at the University of Mississippi, escorted by Federal Marshals.
 October 14, 1962 - October 28, 1962: Cuban Missile Crisis

Major legislation 

 August 30, 1961 : Oil Pollution Act of 1961, 
 September 4, 1961: The Foreign Assistance Act of 1961, 
 September 13, 1961: Interstate Wire Act of 1961, 
 September 21, 1961: Mutual Educational and Cultural Exchange Act of 1961, 
 September 22, 1961: Peace Corps Act of 1961, 
 September 26, 1961: Arms Control and Disarmament Act of 1961, 
 October 15, 1961: Community Health Services and Facilities Act, 
 March 15, 1962: Manpower Development and Training Act, 
 June 28, 1962: Migration and Refugee Assistance Act, 
 August 31, 1962: Communications Satellite Act, 
 October 11, 1962: Trade Expansion Act,

Constitutional amendments 

 March 29, 1961: Twenty-third Amendment ratified, extending the right to vote in the presidential election to citizens residing in the District of Columbia by granting the District electors in the Electoral College, as if it were a state.
 August 27, 1962: Twenty-fourth Amendment approved by Congress and sent to the states for consideration.  It would prohibit both Congress and the states from conditioning the right to vote in federal elections on payment of a poll tax or other types of tax. The amendment was later ratified on January 23, 1964.

Party summary

Senate

House of Representatives

Leadership

Senate 
 President: Richard Nixon (R), until January 20, 1961
 Lyndon B. Johnson (D), from January 20, 1961
 President pro tempore: Carl Hayden (D)

Majority (Democratic) leadership 
 Majority Leader: Mike Mansfield
 Majority Whip: Hubert Humphrey
 Democratic Caucus Secretary: George Smathers

Minority (Republican) leadership 
 Minority Leader: Everett Dirksen
 Minority Whip: Thomas Kuchel
 Republican Conference Chairman: Leverett Saltonstall
 Republican Conference Secretary: Milton Young
 National Senatorial Committee Chair: Barry Goldwater
 Policy Committee Chairman: Styles Bridges (until November 26, 1961)
 Bourke B. Hickenlooper (from January 3, 1962)

House of Representatives 

 Speaker: Sam Rayburn (D), until November 16, 1961
 John W. McCormack (D), from January 10, 1962

Majority (Democratic) leadership 
 Majority Leader: John W. McCormack until January 10, 1962
 Carl Albert, from January 10, 1962
 Majority Whip: Carl Albert, until January 10, 1962
 Hale Boggs, from January 10, 1962
 Democratic Caucus Chairman: Francis E. Walter
 Democratic Caucus Secretary: Leonor Sullivan
 Democratic Campaign Committee Chairman: Michael J. Kirwan

Minority (Republican) leadership 
 Minority Leader: Charles A. Halleck
 Minority Whip: Leslie C. Arends
 Republican Conference Chairman: Charles B. Hoeven
 Policy Committee Chairman: John W. Byrnes
 Republican Campaign Committee Chairman: Bob Wilson

Caucuses 

 House Democratic Caucus
 Senate Democratic Caucus

Members

Senate 
Senators are popularly elected statewide every two years, with one-third beginning new six-year terms with each Congress. Preceding the names in the list below are Senate class numbers, which indicate the cycle of their election, In this Congress, Class 3 meant their term ended with this Congress, requiring re-election in 1962; Class 1 meant their term began in the last Congress, requiring re-election in 1964; and Class 2 meant their term began in this Congress, requiring re-election in 1966.

Currently, this is the last Congressional session in which the Democratic Party commanded all Senate seats from the Deep South, a unity broken when a Republican defeated the appointed successor to Lyndon Johnson’s seat in a 1961 Senate special election.

Alabama 
 2. John Sparkman (D)
 3. J. Lister Hill (D)

Alaska 
 2. Bob Bartlett (D)
 3. Ernest Gruening (D)

Arizona 
 1. Barry Goldwater (R)
 3. Carl Hayden (D)

Arkansas 
 2. John L. McClellan (D)
 3. J. William Fulbright (D)

California 
 1. Clair Engle (D)
 3. Thomas Kuchel (R)

Colorado 
 2. Gordon Allott (R)
 3. John A. Carroll (D)

Connecticut 
 1. Thomas J. Dodd (D)
 3. Prescott Bush (R)

Delaware 
 1. John J. Williams (R)
 2. J. Caleb Boggs (R)

Florida 
 1. Spessard Holland (D)
 3. George Smathers (D)

Georgia 
 2. Richard Russell Jr. (D)
 3. Herman Talmadge (D)

Hawaii 
 1. Hiram Fong (R)
 2. Oren E. Long (D)

Idaho 
 2. Henry Dworshak (R), until July 23, 1962
 Leonard B. Jordan (R), from August 6, 1962
 3. Frank Church (D)

Illinois 
 2. Paul Douglas (D)
 3. Everett Dirksen (R)

Indiana 
 1. Vance Hartke (D)
 3. Homer E. Capehart (R)

Iowa 
 2. Jack Miller (R)
 3. Bourke B. Hickenlooper (R)

Kansas 
 2. Andrew Frank Schoeppel (R), until January 21, 1962
 James B. Pearson (R), from January 31, 1962
 3. Frank Carlson (R)

Kentucky 
 2. John Sherman Cooper (R)
 3. Thruston Ballard Morton (R)

Louisiana 
 2. Allen J. Ellender (D)
 3. Russell B. Long (D)

Maine 
 1. Edmund Muskie (D)
 2. Margaret Chase Smith (R)

Maryland 
 1. James Glenn Beall (R)
 3. John Marshall Butler (R)

Massachusetts 
 1. Benjamin A. Smith II (D), until November 6, 1962
 Ted Kennedy (D), from November 7, 1962
 2. Leverett Saltonstall (R)

Michigan 
 1. Philip Hart (D)
 2. Patrick V. McNamara (D)

Minnesota 
 1. Eugene McCarthy (DFL)
 2. Hubert Humphrey (DFL)

Mississippi 
 1. John C. Stennis (D)
 2. James Eastland (D)

Missouri 
 1. Stuart Symington (D)
 3. Edward V. Long (D)

Montana 
 1. Mike Mansfield (D)
 2. Lee Metcalf (D)

Nebraska 
 1. Roman Hruska (R)
 2. Carl Curtis (R)

Nevada 
 1. Howard Cannon (D)
 3. Alan Bible (D)

New Hampshire 
 2. Styles Bridges (R), until November 26, 1961
 Maurice J. Murphy Jr. (R), from January 10, 1962 - November 6, 1962
 Thomas J. McIntyre (D), from November 7, 1962
 3. Norris Cotton (R)

New Jersey 
 2. Clifford P. Case (R)
 1. Harrison A. Williams (D)

New Mexico 
 1. Dennis Chávez (D), until November 18, 1962
 Edwin L. Mechem (R), from November 30, 1962
 2. Clinton Anderson (D)

New York 
 1. Kenneth Keating (R)
 3. Jacob Javits (R)

North Carolina 
 2. B. Everett Jordan (D)
 3. Sam Ervin (D)

North Dakota 
 1. Quentin Burdick (D-NPL)
 3. Milton Young (R)

Ohio 
 1. Stephen M. Young (D)
 3. Frank Lausche (D)

Oklahoma 
 2. Robert S. Kerr (D), until January 1, 1963, vacant thereafter
 3. Mike Monroney (D)

Oregon 
 2. Maurine Neuberger (D)
 3. Wayne Morse (D)

Pennsylvania 
 1. Hugh Scott (R)
 3. Joseph S. Clark Jr. (D)

Rhode Island 
 1. John Pastore (D)
 2. Claiborne Pell (D)

South Carolina 
 2. Strom Thurmond (D)
 3. Olin D. Johnston (D)

South Dakota 
 2. Karl E. Mundt (R)
 3. Francis H. Case (R), until June 23, 1962
 Joseph H. Bottum (R), from July 9, 1962

Tennessee 
 1. Albert Gore Sr. (D)
 2. Estes Kefauver (D)

Texas 
 1. Ralph Yarborough (D)
 2. Lyndon B. Johnson (D), until January 3, 1961
 William A. Blakley (D), until June 14, 1961
 John Tower (R), from June 15, 1961

Utah 
 1. Frank Moss (D)
 3. Wallace F. Bennett (R)

Vermont 
 1. Winston L. Prouty (R)
 3. George Aiken (R)

Virginia 
 1. Harry F. Byrd (D)
 2. Absalom Willis Robertson (D)

Washington 
 1. Henry M. Jackson (D)
 3. Warren Magnuson (D)

West Virginia 
 1. Robert Byrd (D)
 2. Jennings Randolph (D)

Wisconsin 
 1. William Proxmire (D)
 3. Alexander Wiley (R)

Wyoming 
 1. Gale W. McGee (D)
 2. John J. Hickey (D), until November 6, 1962
 Milward Simpson (R), from November 6, 1962

House of Representatives 
The names of members of the House of Representatives are preceded by their district numbers.

Alabama 
 . Frank W. Boykin (D)
 . George M. Grant (D)
 . George W. Andrews (D)
 . Kenneth A. Roberts (D)
 . Albert Rains (D)
 . Armistead I. Selden Jr. (D)
 . Carl Elliott (D)
 . Robert E. Jones Jr. (D)
 . George Huddleston Jr. (D)

Alaska 
 . Ralph Julian Rivers (D)

Arizona 
 . John Jacob Rhodes (R)
 . Stewart Udall (D), until January 18, 1961
 Mo Udall (D), from May 2, 1961

Arkansas 
 . Ezekiel C. Gathings (D)
 . Wilbur Mills (D)
 . James William Trimble (D)
 . Oren Harris (D)
 . Dale Alford (D)
 . William F. Norrell (D), until February 15, 1961
 Catherine Dorris Norrell (D), from April 18, 1961

California 
 . Clement Woodnutt Miller (D), until October 7, 1962
 . Harold T. Johnson (D)
 . John E. Moss (D)
 . William S. Mailliard (R)
 . John F. Shelley (D)
 . John F. Baldwin Jr. (R)
 . Jeffery Cohelan (D)
 . George P. Miller (D)
 . J. Arthur Younger (R)
 . Charles Gubser (R)
 . John J. McFall (D)
 . B. F. Sisk (D)
 . Charles M. Teague (R)
 . Harlan Hagen (D)
 . Gordon L. McDonough (R)
 . Alphonzo E. Bell Jr. (R)
 . Cecil R. King (D)
 . Craig Hosmer (R)
 . Chet Holifield (D)
 . H. Allen Smith (R)
 . Edgar W. Hiestand (R)
 . James C. Corman (D)
 . Clyde Doyle (D)
 . Glenard P. Lipscomb (R)
 . John H. Rousselot (R)
 . James Roosevelt (D)
 . Harry R. Sheppard (D)
 . James B. Utt (R)
 . Dalip Singh Saund (D)
 . Bob Wilson (R)

Colorado 
 . Byron G. Rogers (D)
 . Peter H. Dominick (R)
 . John Chenoweth (R)
 . Wayne N. Aspinall (D)

Connecticut 
 . Emilio Q. Daddario (D)
 . Horace Seely-Brown Jr. (R)
 . Robert Giaimo (D)
 . Abner W. Sibal (R)
 . John S. Monagan (D)
 . Frank Kowalski (D)

Delaware 
 . Harris McDowell (D)

Florida 
 . William C. Cramer (R)
 . Charles E. Bennett (D)
 . Bob Sikes (D)
 . Dante Fascell (D)
 . Syd Herlong (D)
 . Paul Rogers (D)
 . James A. Haley (D)
 . Donald Ray Matthews (D)

Georgia 
 . George Elliott Hagan (D)
 . J. L. Pilcher (D)
 . Tic Forrester (D)
 . John Flynt (D)
 . James C. Davis (D)
 . Carl Vinson (D)
 . John William Davis (D)
 . Iris Faircloth Blitch (D)
 . Phillip M. Landrum (D)
 . Robert Grier Stephens Jr. (D)

Hawaii 
 . Daniel Inouye (D)

Idaho 
 . Gracie Pfost (D)
 . Ralph R. Harding (D)

Illinois 
 . William L. Dawson (D)
 . Barratt O'Hara (D)
 . William T. Murphy (D)
 . Ed Derwinski (R)
 . John C. Kluczynski (D)
 . Thomas J. O'Brien (D)
 . Roland V. Libonati (D)
 . Dan Rostenkowski (D)
 . Sidney R. Yates (D)
 . Harold R. Collier (R)
 . Roman Pucinski (D)
 . Edward Rowan Finnegan (D)
 . Marguerite S. Church (R)
 . Elmer J. Hoffman (R)
 . Noah M. Mason (R)
 . John B. Anderson (R)
 . Leslie C. Arends (R)
 . Robert H. Michel (R)
 . Robert B. Chiperfield (R)
 . Paul Findley (R)
 . Peter F. Mack Jr. (D)
 . William L. Springer (R)
 . George E. Shipley (D)
 . Melvin Price (D)
 . Kenneth J. Gray (D)

Indiana 
 . Ray Madden (D)
 . Charles A. Halleck (R)
 . John Brademas (D)
 . E. Ross Adair (R)
 . J. Edward Roush (D)
 . Richard L. Roudebush (R)
 . William G. Bray (R)
 . Winfield K. Denton (D)
 . Earl Wilson (R)
 . Ralph Harvey (R)
 . Donald C. Bruce (R)

Iowa 
 . Fred Schwengel (R)
 . James E. Bromwell (R)
 . H. R. Gross (R)
 . John Henry Kyl (R)
 . Neal Edward Smith (D)
 . Merwin Coad (D)
 . Ben F. Jensen (R)
 . Charles B. Hoeven (R)

Kansas 
 . William H. Avery (R)
 . Robert Ellsworth (R)
 . Walter Lewis McVey Jr. (R)
 . Garner E. Shriver (R)
 . James Floyd Breeding (D)
 . Bob Dole (R)

Kentucky 
 . Frank Stubblefield (D)
 . William Natcher (D)
 . Frank W. Burke (D)
 . Frank Chelf (D)
 . Brent Spence (D)
 . John C. Watts (D)
 . Carl D. Perkins (D)
 . Eugene Siler (R)

Louisiana 
 . F. Edward Hébert (D)
 . Hale Boggs (D)
 . Edwin E. Willis (D)
 . Overton Brooks (D), until September 16, 1961
 Joe Waggonner (D), from December 19, 1961
 . Otto Passman (D)
 . James H. Morrison (D)
 . T. Ashton Thompson (D)
 . Harold B. McSween (D)

Maine 
 . Peter A. Garland (R)
 . Stanley R. Tupper (R)
 . Clifford McIntire (R)

Maryland 
 . Thomas Francis Johnson (D)
 . Daniel Brewster (D)
 . Edward Garmatz (D)
 . George Hyde Fallon (D)
 . Richard Lankford (D)
 . Charles Mathias (R)
 . Samuel Friedel (D)

Massachusetts 
 . Silvio O. Conte (R)
 . Edward Boland (D)
 . Philip J. Philbin (D)
 . Harold Donohue (D)
 . F. Bradford Morse (R)
 . William H. Bates (R)
 . Thomas J. Lane (D)
 . Torbert Macdonald (D)
 . Hastings Keith (R)
 . Laurence Curtis (R)
 . Tip O'Neill (D)
 . John W. McCormack (D)
 . James A. Burke (D)
 . Joseph W. Martin Jr. (R)

Michigan 
 . Thaddeus M. Machrowicz (D), until September 18, 1961
 Lucien Nedzi (D), from November 7, 1961
 . George Meader (R)
 . August E. Johansen (R)
 . Clare Hoffman (R)
 . Gerald Ford (R)
 . Charles E. Chamberlain (R)
 . James G. O'Hara (D)
 . R. James Harvey (R)
 . Robert P. Griffin (R)
 . Elford Albin Cederberg (R)
 . Victor A. Knox (R)
 . John B. Bennett (R)
 . Charles Diggs (D)
 . Louis C. Rabaut (D), until November 12, 1961
 Harold M. Ryan (D), from February 13, 1962
 . John Dingell (D)
 . John Lesinski Jr. (D)
 . Martha Griffiths (D)
 . William Broomfield (R)

Minnesota 
 . Al Quie (R)
 . Ancher Nelsen (R)
 . Clark MacGregor (R)
 . Joseph Karth (DFL)
 . Walter Judd (R)
 . Fred Marshall (DFL)
 . Herman Carl Andersen (R)
 . John Blatnik (DFL)
 . Odin Langen (R)

Mississippi 
 . Thomas Abernethy (D)
 . Jamie Whitten (D)
 . Frank Ellis Smith (D), until November 14, 1962
 . John Bell Williams (D)
 . W. Arthur Winstead (D)
 . William M. Colmer (D)

Missouri 
 . Frank M. Karsten (D)
 . Thomas B. Curtis (R)
 . Leonor Sullivan (D)
 . William J. Randall (D)
 . Richard Walker Bolling (D)
 . William Raleigh Hull Jr. (D)
 . Durward Gorham Hall (R)
 . Richard Howard Ichord Jr. (D)
 . Clarence Cannon (D)
 . Paul C. Jones (D)
 . Morgan M. Moulder (D)

Montana 
 . Arnold Olsen (D)
 . James F. Battin (R)

Nebraska 
 . Phillip Hart Weaver (R)
 . Glenn Cunningham (R)
 . Ralph F. Beermann (R)
 . David Martin (R)

Nevada 
 . Walter S. Baring Jr. (D)

New Hampshire 
 . Chester Earl Merrow (R)
 . Perkins Bass (R)

New Jersey 
 . William T. Cahill (R)
 . Milton W. Glenn (R)
 . James C. Auchincloss (R)
 . Frank Thompson (D)
 . Peter Frelinghuysen Jr. (R)
 . Florence P. Dwyer (R)
 . William B. Widnall (R)
 . Charles Samuel Joelson (D)
 . Frank C. Osmers Jr. (R)
 . Peter W. Rodino (D)
 . Hugh Joseph Addonizio (D), until June 30, 1962
 . George M. Wallhauser (R)
 . Cornelius Gallagher (D)
 . Dominick V. Daniels (D)

New Mexico 
 . Thomas G. Morris (D)
 . Joseph Montoya (D)

New York 
 . Otis G. Pike (D)
 . Steven Derounian (R)
 . Frank J. Becker (R)
 . Seymour Halpern (R)
 . Joseph P. Addabbo (D)
 . Lester Holtzman (D), until December 31, 1961
 Benjamin Stanley Rosenthal (D), from February 20, 1962
 . James J. Delaney (D)
 . Victor Anfuso (D)
 . Eugene James Keogh (D)
 . Edna F. Kelly (D)
 . Emanuel Celler (D)
 . Hugh Carey (D)
 . Abraham J. Multer (D)
 . John J. Rooney (D)
 . John H. Ray (R)
 . Adam Clayton Powell Jr. (D)
 . John Lindsay (R)
 . Alfred E. Santangelo (D)
 . Leonard Farbstein (D)
 . William Fitts Ryan (D)
 . Herbert Zelenko (D)
 . James C. Healey (D)
 . Jacob H. Gilbert (D)
 . Charles A. Buckley (D)
 . Paul A. Fino (R)
 . Edwin B. Dooley (R)
 . Robert R. Barry (R)
 . Katharine St. George (R)
 . J. Ernest Wharton (R)
 . Leo W. O'Brien (D)
 . Carleton J. King (R)
 . Samuel S. Stratton (D)
 . Clarence E. Kilburn (R)
 . Alexander Pirnie (R)
 . R. Walter Riehlman (R)
 . John Taber (R)
 . Howard W. Robison (R)
 . Jessica M. Weis (R)
 . Harold C. Ostertag (R)
 . William E. Miller (R)
 . Thaddeus J. Dulski (D)
 . John R. Pillion (R)
 . Charles Goodell (R)

North Carolina 
 . Herbert Covington Bonner (D)
 . Lawrence H. Fountain (D)
 . David N. Henderson (D)
 . Harold D. Cooley (D)
 . Ralph James Scott (D)
 . Horace R. Kornegay (D)
 . Alton Lennon (D)
 . Alvin Paul Kitchin (D)
 . Hugh Quincy Alexander (D)
 . Charles R. Jonas (R)
 . Basil Lee Whitener (D)
 . Roy A. Taylor (D)

North Dakota 
 . Don L. Short (R)
 . Hjalmar Carl Nygaard (R)

Ohio 
 . Gordon H. Scherer (R)
 . Donald D. Clancy (R)
 . Paul F. Schenck (R)
 . William Moore McCulloch (R)
 . Del Latta (R)
 . Bill Harsha (R)
 . Clarence J. Brown (R)
 . Jackson Edward Betts (R)
 . Thomas L. Ashley (D)
 . Walter H. Moeller (D)
 . Robert E. Cook (D)
 . Samuel L. Devine (R)
 . Charles Adams Mosher (R)
 . William Hanes Ayres (R)
 . Tom Van Horn Moorehead (R)
 . Frank T. Bow (R)
 . John M. Ashbrook (R)
 . Wayne Hays (D)
 . Michael J. Kirwan (D)
 . Michael A. Feighan (D)
 . Charles Vanik (D)
 . Frances P. Bolton (R)
 . William Edwin Minshall Jr. (R)

Oklahoma 
 . Page Belcher (R)
 . Ed Edmondson (D)
 . Carl Albert (D)
 . Tom Steed (D)
 . John Jarman (D)
 . Victor Wickersham (D)

Oregon 
 . A. Walter Norblad (R)
 . Al Ullman (D)
 . Edith Green (D)
 . Edwin Durno (R)

Pennsylvania 
 . William A. Barrett (D)
 . Kathryn E. Granahan (D)
 . James A. Byrne (D)
 . Robert N. C. Nix Sr. (D)
 . William J. Green Jr. (D)
 . Herman Toll (D)
 . William H. Milliken Jr. (R)
 . Willard S. Curtin (R)
 . Paul B. Dague (R)
 . William Scranton (R)
 . Dan Flood (D)
 . Ivor D. Fenton (R)
 . Richard Schweiker (R)
 . George M. Rhodes (D)
 . Francis E. Walter (D)
 . Walter M. Mumma (R), until February 25, 1961
 John C. Kunkel (R), from May 16, 1961
 . Herman T. Schneebeli (R)
 . J. Irving Whalley (R)
 . George Atlee Goodling (R)
 . James E. Van Zandt (R)
 . John Herman Dent (D)
 . John P. Saylor (R)
 . Leon H. Gavin (R)
 . Carroll D. Kearns (R)
 . Frank M. Clark (D)
 . Thomas E. Morgan (D)
 . James G. Fulton (R)
 . William S. Moorhead (D)
 . Robert J. Corbett (R)
 . Elmer J. Holland (D)

Rhode Island 
 . Fernand St. Germain (D)
 . John E. Fogarty (D)

South Carolina 
 . L. Mendel Rivers (D)
 . John J. Riley (D), until January 1, 1962
 Corinne Boyd Riley (D), from April 10, 1962
 . W.J. Bryan Dorn (D)
 . Robert T. Ashmore (D)
 . Robert W. Hemphill (D)
 . John L. McMillan (D)

South Dakota 
 . Ben Reifel (R)
 . Ellis Yarnal Berry (R)

Tennessee 
 . B. Carroll Reece (R), until March 19, 1961
 Louise Goff Reece (R), from May 16, 1961
 . Howard Baker Sr. (R)
 . James B. Frazier Jr. (D)
 . Joe L. Evins (D)
 . Joseph Carlton Loser (D)
 . Ross Bass (D)
 . Tom J. Murray (D)
 . Fats Everett (D)
 . Clifford Davis (D)

Texas 
 . Wright Patman (D)
 . Jack Brooks (D)
 . Lindley Beckworth (D)
 . Sam Rayburn (D), until November 16, 1961
 Ray Roberts (D), from January 30, 1962
 . Bruce Alger (R)
 . Olin E. Teague (D)
 . John Dowdy (D)
 . Albert Thomas (D)
 . Clark W. Thompson (D)
 . Homer Thornberry (D)
 . William R. Poage (D)
 . Jim Wright (D)
 . Frank N. Ikard (D), until December 15, 1961
 Graham B. Purcell Jr. (D), from January 27, 1962
 . John Andrew Young (D)
 . Joe M. Kilgore (D)
 . J. T. Rutherford (D)
 . Omar Burleson (D)
 . Walter E. Rogers (D)
 . George H. Mahon (D)
 . Paul J. Kilday (D), until September 24, 1961
 Henry B. González (D), from November 4, 1961
 . O. C. Fisher (D)
 . Robert R. Casey (D)

Utah 
 . M. Blaine Peterson (D)
 . David S. King (D)

Vermont 
 . Robert Stafford (R)

Virginia 
 . Thomas N. Downing (D)
 . Porter Hardy Jr. (D)
 . J. Vaughan Gary (D)
 . Watkins Moorman Abbitt (D)
 . William M. Tuck (D)
 . Richard Harding Poff (R)
 . Burr Harrison (D)
 . Howard W. Smith (D)
 . W. Pat Jennings (D)
 . Joel Broyhill (R)

Washington 
 . Thomas Pelly (R)
 . Jack Westland (R)
 . Julia Butler Hansen (D)
 . Catherine Dean May (R)
 . Walt Horan (R)
 . Thor C. Tollefson (R)
 . Donald H. Magnuson (D)

West Virginia 
 . Arch A. Moore Jr. (R)
 . Harley Orrin Staggers (D)
 . Cleveland M. Bailey (D)
 . Ken Hechler (D)
 . Elizabeth Kee (D)
 . John M. Slack Jr. (D)

Wisconsin 
 . Henry C. Schadeberg (R)
 . Robert Kastenmeier (D)
 . Vernon Wallace Thomson (R)
 . Clement J. Zablocki (D)
 . Henry S. Reuss (D)
 . William Van Pelt (R)
 . Melvin Laird (R)
 . John W. Byrnes (R)
 . Lester Johnson (D)
 . Alvin O'Konski (R)

Wyoming 
 . William Henry Harrison III (R)

Non-voting members 
 . Antonio Fernós-Isern (Resident Commissioner) (PPD)

Changes in membership

Senate 

|-
| Texas(2)
|  | William A. Blakley (D)
| Lost special election.Successor elected June 14, 1961.
|  | John Tower (R)
| June 15, 1961

|-
| New Hampshire(2)
|  | Styles Bridges (R)
| Died November 26, 1961.Successor appointed December 7, 1961.
|  | Maurice J. Murphy Jr. (R)
| December 7, 1961

|-
| Kansas(2)
|  | Andrew Frank Schoeppel (R)
| Died January 21, 1962.Successor appointed January 31, 1962, and then elected November 6, 1962.
|  | James B. Pearson (R)
| January 31, 1962

|-
| South Dakota(3)
|  | Francis H. Case (R)
| Died June 23, 1962.Successor appointed July 9, 1962 to finish the term.
|  | Joseph H. Bottum (R)
| July 9, 1962

|-
| Idaho(2)
|  | Henry Dworshak (R)
| Died July 23, 1962.Successor appointed August 6, 1962, and then elected November 6, 1962.
|  | Leonard B. Jordan (R)
| August 6, 1962

|-
| Wyoming(2)
|  | John J. Hickey (D)
| Lost special election.Successor elected November 6, 1962.
|  | Milward Simpson (R)
| November 6, 1962

|-
| Massachusetts(1)
|  | Benjamin A. Smith II (D)
| Successor elected November 6, 1962.
|  | Ted Kennedy (D)
| November 7, 1962

|-
| New Hampshire(2)
|  | Maurice J. Murphy Jr. (R)
| Lost special election.Successor elected November 6, 1962.
|  | Thomas J. McIntyre (D)
| November 7, 1962

|-
| New Mexico(1)
|  | Dennis Chávez (D)
| Died November 18, 1962.Successor appointed November 30, 1962 to continue the term.
|  | Edwin L. Mechem (R)
| November 30, 1962

|-
| Oklahoma(2)
|  | Robert S. Kerr (D)
| Died January 1, 1963.
| Vacant
| Not filled this term

|}

House of Representatives 

|-
| 
|  nowrap| Stewart Udall (D)
| Resigned January 18, 1961 to become United States Secretary of the Interior.
|  | Mo Udall (D)
| May 2, 1961

|-
| 
|  nowrap| William F. Norrell (D)
| Died February 15, 1961.
|  | Catherine Dorris Norrell (D)
| April 18, 1961

|-
| 
|  nowrap| Walter M. Mumma (R)
| Died February 25, 1961.
|  | John C. Kunkel (R)
| May 16, 1961

|-
| 
|  nowrap| B. Carroll Reece (R)
| Died March 19, 1961.
|  | Louise Goff Reece (R)
| May 16, 1961

|-
| 
|  nowrap| Overton Brooks (D)
| Died September 16, 1961.
|  | Joe Waggonner (D)
| December 19, 1961

|-
| 
|  nowrap| Thaddeus M. Machrowicz (D)
| Resigned September 18, 1961 to become judge of the United States District Court for the Eastern District of Michigan.
|  | Lucien Nedzi (D)
| November 7, 1961

|-
| 
|  nowrap| Paul J. Kilday (D)
| Resigned September 24, 1961 to become judge of United States Court of Appeals for the Armed Forces.
|  | Henry B. González (D)
| November 4, 1961

|-
| 
|  nowrap| Louis C. Rabaut (D)
| Died November 12, 1961.
|  | Harold M. Ryan (D)
| February 13, 1962

|-
| 
|  nowrap| Sam Rayburn (D)
| Died November 16, 1961.
|  | Ray Roberts (D)
| January 30, 1962

|-
| 
|  nowrap| Frank N. Ikard (D)
| Resigned December 15, 1961.
|  | Graham B. Purcell Jr. (D)
| January 27, 1962

|-
| 
|  nowrap| Lester Holtzman (D)
| Resigned December 31, 1961 to become judge of the New York Supreme Court.
|  | Benjamin Stanley Rosenthal (D)
| February 20, 1962

|-
| 
|  nowrap| John J. Riley (D)
| Died January 1, 1962.
|  | Corinne Boyd Riley (D)
| April 10, 1962

|-
| 
|  nowrap| Hugh Joseph Addonizio (D)
| Resigned June 30, 1962 to become Mayor of Newark, New Jersey.
| rowspan=3 | Vacant
| rowspan=3 | Not filled this term

|-
| 
|  nowrap| Clement Woodnutt Miller (D)
| Died October 7, 1962.

|-
| 
|  nowrap| Frank Ellis Smith (D)
| Resigned November 14, 1962.

|}

Committees

Senate 
 Aging: (Chairman: Pat McNamara;)
 Aeronautical and Space Sciences (Chairman: Robert S. Kerr;)
 Agriculture and Forestry (Chairman: Allen J. Ellender;)
 Appropriations (Chairman: Carl Hayden;)
 Armed Services (Chairman: Richard B. Russell;)
 Banking and Currency (Chairman: A. Willis Robertson;)
 District of Columbia (Chairman: Alan Bible;)  
 Finance (Chairman: Harry F. Byrd;)
 Foreign Relations (Chairman: J. William Fulbright;)
 Government Operations (Chairman: John L. McClellan;)
 Interior and Insular Affairs (Chairman: Clinton P. Anderson;)
 Interstate and Foreign Commerce (Chairman: Warren G. Magnuson;)
 Judiciary (Chairman: James O. Eastland;)
 Labor and Public Welfare (Chairman: J. Lister Hill;)
 National Fuels Study (Special)
 National Water Resources (Select)
 Post Office and Civil Service (Chairman: Olin D. Johnston;)
 Public Works (Chairman: Dennis Chavez;)
 Rules and Administration (Chairman: Mike Mansfield;)
 Small Business (Select) (Chairman: John J. Sparkman;)
 Subcommittee on Internal Security
 Whole

House of Representatives 
 Agriculture (Chairman: Harold D. Cooley;)
 Appropriations (Chairman: Clarence Cannon;)
 Armed Services (Chairman: Carl Vinson;)
 Banking and Currency (Chairman: Brent Spence;)
 District of Columbia (Chairman: John L. McMillan;)
 Education and Labor (Chairman: Adam Clayton Powell;)
 Export Control (Select) (Chairman: N/A; Ranking Member: N/A)
 Foreign Affairs (Chairman: Thomas E. Morgan;)
 Government Operations (Chairman: William L. Dawson;)
 House Administration (Chairman: Omar Burleson;)
 Interior and Insular Affairs (Chairman: Wayne N. Aspinall;)
 Interstate and Foreign Commerce (Chairman: Oren Harris;)
 Judiciary (Chairman: Emanuel Celler;)
 Merchant Marine and Fisheries (Chairman: Herbert C. Bonner;)
 Post Office and Civil Service (Chairman: Tom J. Murray;)
 Public Works (Chairman: Charles A. Buckley;)
 Rules (Chairman: Howard W. Smith;)
 Science and Astronautics (Chairman: Overton Brooks then George P. Miller;) 
 Small Business (Select) (Chairman: Wright Patman;)
 Standards of Official Conduct
 Un-American Activities (Chairman: Francis E. Walter;)
 Veterans' Affairs (Chairman: Olin E. Teague; Vice Chairman: Rep. )
 Ways and Means (Chairman: Wilbur D. Mills; Vice Chairman: Rep. )
 Whole

Joint committees 
 Atomic Energy (Chairman: Rep. Chet Holifield; Vice Chairman: Sen. )
 Conditions of Indian Tribes (Special)
 Construction of a Building for a Museum of History and Technology for the Smithsonian
 Defense Production (Chairman: Sen. A. Willis Robertson; Vice Chairman: Rep. )
 Economic (Chairman: Rep. Wright Patman; Vice Chairman: Sen. )
 Immigration and Nationality Policy (Chairman: Vacant; Vice Chairman: Vacant)
 Legislative Budget
 The Library (Chairman: Rep. Omar Burleson; Vice Chairman: Sen. )
 Navajo-Hopi Indian Administration
 Printing (Chairman: Rep. Carl Hayden; Vice Chairman: Sen. )
 Reduction of Nonessential Federal Expenditures (Chairman: Sen. Harry F. Byrd; Vice Chairman: Rep. )
 Taxation (Chairman: Rep. Wilbur D. Mills; Vice Chairman: Sen. )

Employees

Legislative branch agency directors 
 Architect of the Capitol: J. George Stewart
 Attending Physician of the United States Congress: George Calver
 Comptroller General of the United States: Joseph Campbell 
 Librarian of Congress: Lawrence Quincy Mumford 
 Public Printer of the United States: Raymond Blattenberger, until 1961 
 James L. Harrison, from 1961

Senate 
 Chaplain: Frederick Brown Harris (Methodist)
 Parliamentarian: Charles Watkins
 Secretary: Felton McLellan Johnston
 Librarian: Richard D. Hupman
 Secretary for the Majority: Robert G. Baker
 Secretary for the Minority: J. Mark Trice
 Sergeant at Arms: Joseph C. Duke

House of Representatives 
 Chaplain: Bernard Braskamp (Presbyterian)
 Clerk: Ralph R. Roberts
 Doorkeeper: William Mosley "Fishbait" Miller
 Parliamentarian: Lewis Deschler
 Postmaster: H. H. Morris
 Reading Clerk: George J. Maurer (D) and Joe Bartlett (R) 
 Sergeant at Arms: Zeake W. Johnson Jr.

See also 

 1960 United States elections (elections leading to this Congress)
 1960 United States presidential election
 1960 United States Senate elections
 1960 United States House of Representatives elections
 1962 United States elections (elections during this Congress, leading to the next Congress)
 1962 United States Senate elections
 1962 United States House of Representatives elections

Notes

References

External links 

 Biographical Directory of the U.S. Congress
 U.S. House of Representatives: Congressional History
 U.S. Senate: Statistics and Lists